Fru or FRU may refer to:

FRU
 Federal Reserve Unit, of the Royal Malaysian Police
 Field-replaceable unit
 Fiji Rugby Union
 Film Resource Unit, a South African film distributor
 Fleet Radio Unit, of the United States Navy active during World War II
 Florida Rugby Union
 Force Research Unit, a covert military intelligence unit of the British Army in Northern Ireland
 Free Representation Unit, a British legal charity
 Fluid Rotary Unit
 Functional Record Update syntax

People
 Fru Hazlitt (born 1963), a British broadcasting executive
 John Fru Ndi (born 1941), Cameroonian politician
 John Frusciante (born 1970), American musician

Other
 Fru (video game), a 2016 video game
 Fruitless (gene), of Drosophila melanogaster
 Manas International Airport, in Bishkek, Kyrgyzstan, has the IATA airport code FRU.